Harleyville is a town in Dorchester County, South Carolina, United States. The population was 677 at the 2010 census, up from 594 at the 2000 census. Harleyville is part of the Charleston-North Charleston-Summerville metropolitan area. As of 2018 the population is 696.

History
Harleyville was named after the Harley family.

The St. Paul Camp Ground was added to the National Register of Historic Places in 1998.

Geography
Harleyville is located in northern Dorchester County at  (33.2122, -80.4486). U.S. Route 178 passes through the center of town, leading northwest  to Orangeburg and southeast  to its terminus at U.S. Route 78. South Carolina Highway 453 leads north  to Exit 177 on Interstate 26; I-26 leads northwest  to Columbia and southeast  to Charleston.

The Audubon's Francis Beidler  forest is located just outside of town. Within the park, there are miles of boardwalks through the old four hole swamp.

Demographics

As of the census of 2010, there were 693 people, 250 households, and 165 families residing in the town. The population density was 601.1 people per square mile (231.7/km2). There were 282 housing units at an average density of 285.4 per square mile (110.0/km2). The racial makeup of the town was 59.26% White, 38.38% African American, 0.67% Native American, 0.17% from other races, and 1.52% from two or more races. Hispanic or Latino of any race were 1.18% of the population.

There were 250 households, out of which 31.2% had children under the age of 18 living with them, 38.0% were married couples living together, 22.0% had a female householder with no husband present, and 34.0% were non-families. 30.8% of all households were made up of individuals, and 16.4% had someone living alone who was 65 years of age or older. The average household size was 2.38 and the average family size was 2.99.

In the town, the population was spread out, with 28.3% under the age of 18, 7.6% from 18 to 24, 23.6% from 25 to 44, 24.6% from 45 to 64, and 16.0% who were 65 years of age or older. The median age was 38 years. For every 100 females, there were 83.3 males. For every 100 females age 18 and over, there were 75.3 males.

The median income for a household in the town was $26,397, and the median income for a family was $35,313. Males had a median income of $33,083 versus $21,875 for females. The per capita income for the town was $16,412. About 23.1% of families and 43.4% of the population were below the poverty line, including 25.2% of those under age 18 and 22.9% of those age 65 or over.

See also

 List of municipalities in South Carolina

References

External links

 Town of Harleyville official website

Towns in Dorchester County, South Carolina
Towns in South Carolina
Charleston–North Charleston–Summerville metropolitan area